Vijin-e Bala (also Romanized as Vījīn-e Bālā; also known as Vījīn and Vābajīn) is a village in Hasanabad Rural District, Fashapuyeh District, Ray County, Tehran Province, Iran. At the 2006 census, its population was 777, in 179 families.

References 

Populated places in Ray County, Iran